This is a list of 1983 British incumbents.

Government
 Monarch
 Head of State – Elizabeth II, Queen of the United Kingdom (1952–2022)
 Prime Minister
 Head of Government – Margaret Thatcher, Prime Minister of the United Kingdom (1979–1990)
First Lord of the Treasury
 Margaret Thatcher, First Lord of the Treasury (1979–1990)
Chancellor of the Exchequer
 Sir Geoffrey Howe, Chancellor of the Exchequer (1979–1983)
 Nigel Lawson, Chancellor of the Exchequer (1983–1989)
Second Lord of the Treasury
 Sir Geoffrey Howe, Second Lord of the Treasury (1979–1983)
 Nigel Lawson, Second Lord of the Treasury (1983–1989)
Secretary of State for Foreign and Commonwealth Affairs
 Francis Pym, Secretary of State for Foreign and Commonwealth Affairs (1982–1983)
 Sir Geoffrey Howe, Secretary of State for Foreign and Commonwealth Affairs (1983–1989)
Secretary of State for the Home Department
 William Whitelaw, Secretary of State for the Home Department (1979–1983)
 Leon Brittan, Secretary of State for the Home Department (1983–1985)
Secretary of State for Transport
 David Howell, Secretary of State for Transport (1981–1983)
 Nicholas Ridley, Secretary of State for Transport (1983–1986)
Secretary of State for Scotland
 George Younger, Secretary of State for Scotland (1979–1986)
Secretary of State for Social Services
 Norman Fowler, Secretary of State for Social Services (1981–1987)
Secretary of State for Northern Ireland
 James Prior, Secretary of State for Northern Ireland (1981–1984)
Secretary of State for Defence
 John Nott, Secretary of State for Defence (1981–1983)
 Michael Heseltine, Secretary of State for Defence (1983–1986)
Secretary of State for Industry
 Patrick Jenkin, Secretary of State for Industry (1981–1983)
 See Secretary of State for Trade and Industry for post-1983
Secretary of State for Trade
 Francis Cockfield, Baron Cockfield, Secretary of State for Trade (1982–1983)
 See Secretary of State for Trade and Industry for post-1983
Secretary of State for Trade and Industry
 See Secretary of State for Trade and Secretary of State for Industry for pre-1983 incumbents
 Cecil Edward Parkinson, Secretary of State for Trade and Industry (1983)
 Norman Tebbit, Secretary of State for Trade and Industry (1983–1985)
Secretary of State for Education and Science
 Sir Keith Joseph, Bt., Secretary of State for Education and Science (1981–1986)
Secretary of State for Wales
 Nicholas Edwards, Secretary of State for Wales (1979–1987)
Lord Privy Seal
 Janet Young, Baroness Young, Lord Privy Seal (1982–1983)
 John Biffen, Lord Privy Seal (1983–1987)
Leader of the House of Commons
 John Biffen, Leader of the House of Commons (1982–1987)
Lord President of the Council
 John Biffen, Lord President of the Council (1982–1983)
 William Whitelaw, 1st Viscount Whitelaw, Lord President of the Council (1983–1988)
Lord Chancellor
 Quintin Hogg, Baron Hailsham of St Marylebone, Lord Chancellor (1979–1987)
Chancellor of the Duchy of Lancaster
 Cecil Parkinson, Chancellor of the Duchy of Lancaster (1982–1983)
 Francis Cockfield, Baron Cockfield, Chancellor of the Duchy of Lancaster (1983–1984)

Religion
 Archbishop of Canterbury
 Robert Runcie, Archbishop of Canterbury (1980–1991)
 Archbishop of York
 Stuart Blanch, Archbishop of York (1975–1983; retired before 5 September)
 John Habgood, Archbishop of York (1983–1995; installed 18 November)

1983
Leaders
British incumbents